The women's singles was a tennis event held as part of the Tennis at the 1920 Summer Olympics programme. A total of 18 players from 7 nations competed in the event, which was held from 16 to 24 August 1920 at the Beerschot Tennis Club. The event was won by Suzanne Lenglen of France, defeating Dorothy Holman of Great Britain in the final. It was the second consecutive victory for a French woman, with Marguerite Broquedis winning the pre-war 1912 tournament. Kathleen McKane Godfree of Great Britain defeated Sigrid Fick of Sweden in the bronze-medal match.

Lenglen's victory was comprehensive, as she lost only 4 games in her 5 matches (1 to Fick in the semifinals, 3 to Holman in the final).

Background

This was the fourth appearance of the women's singles tennis. A women's event was held only once during the first three Games (only men's tennis was played in 1896 and 1904), but has been held at every Olympics for which there was a tennis tournament since 1908. Tennis was not a medal sport from 1928 to 1984, though there were demonstration events in 1968 and 1984.

France's Suzanne Lenglen was the "dominant women's player in the world, and considered by some as the greatest female player of all time." She highlighted a strong field, including top British players Dorothy Holman and Kathleen McKane Godfree. Absent were Molla Mallory (a bronze medalist for Norway in 1912 who had emigrated to the United States; in 1921, she would be the only woman to beat Lenglen post-war), Dorothea Douglass Lambert Chambers of Great Britain (the 1908 Olympic gold medalist and seven-time Wimbledon winner, who had reached the Wimbledon finals in 1919 and 1920, losing both to Lenglen), and Elizabeth Ryan of the United States (long-time doubles partner of Lenglen, who would reach the 1921 Wimbledon singles final against her).

Belgium, Denmark, and Italy each made their debut in the event. France and Great Britain each made their third appearance, tied for most among nations to that point.

Competition format

The competition was a single-elimination tournament with a bronze-medal match. All matches were best-of-three sets.

Schedule

Draw

Finals

Top half

Bottom half

References

Sources
 
 
  ITF, 2008 Olympic Tennis Event Media Guide

Women's singles
1920 in women's tennis
Ten